Below are the squads for the 2020 Women's Bandy World Championship.

Group A

Sweden

Russia

Norway

Finland

United States (USA)

Group B

Japan

Estonia

Switzerland

References 
 Women's World Championship Bandy 2020

Bandy World Championship squads